The Oppo Find X is the 2018 flagship smartphone from the Oppo Find series and was launched on 19 June 2018 in Paris by Oppo. The Find X features a different design from traditional smartphones, as it has a mechanic pop-up camera. The phone has a screen to body ratio of 87%, the thinnest bezels in the market when it launched, and is considered the first "all screen" smartphone to be released.

Specifications

Hardware
It is powered by Qualcomm Snapdragon 845 processor, 8 GB of RAM, 256 GB of storage and operates on Android 8.1 (Oreo) which is Color OS customised. The pop up contains both the 25 MP front camera and dual 16 + 20 MP rear cameras. It also has a 3,730 mAh battery and is powered by VOOC fast wired charging. The Lamborghini edition of the phone comes with 512 GB storage and supports SuperVOOC fast wired charging which can charge from 0 to 100% in 35 minutes. According to Oppo, Find X will be its first phone to have global LTE compatibility which is crucial for the company to enter the European and North American market, the phone supports no fingerprint scanner to unlock the device and instead relies on facial recognition known as O-Face, which is done by the pop up taking as little as 0.5 s to pop up and unlock the phone. It is the first phone to feature an entirely virtualized (software-driven) proximity sensor, as there was no space on the front face to include such a physical sensor.

The selfie camera has 3D Smart Selfie Capture that can simulate various lighting effects for portrait lighting and it has an 3D OMoji feature while the dual rear camera can recognize 800 scenes in 20 scenarios (Food, Pets, Snow, etc.).

Software
Oppo Find X ships with Android 8.1 Oreo.

See also 
 Oppo phones

References 

Android (operating system) devices
Mobile phones introduced in 2018
Mobile phones with multiple rear cameras
Mobile phones with 4K video recording
Discontinued flagship smartphones
Oppo smartphones